The 2017 Liga Premier, also known as the 100PLUS Liga Premier for sponsorship reasons, was the 14th season of the Liga Premier, the second-tier professional football league in Malaysia. Kuala Lumpur were crowned the champions and were promoted to Liga Super since relegated in 2012 season.

The season started on 20 January and concluded on 27 October 2017.

Teams, stadiums, and personnel

Teams
A total of 12 teams contested the league, including 8 sides from the 2016 season, two relegated from the 2016 Liga Super and two promoted from the 2016 Liga FAM.

Teams changes

To Liga Premier
Promoted from Liga FAM
 MIFA 
 PKNP

Relegated from Liga Super
 PDRM
 Terengganu

From Liga Premier
Promoted to Liga Super
 Melaka United
 PKNS

Relegated to Liga FAM
 Sime Darby

Team withdraw
 DRB-HICOM (joined the Kuala Lumpur League Division 1)

Stadia and locations

Note: Table lists in alphabetical order.

Personnel and sponsoring

Note: Flags indicate national team as has been defined under FIFA eligibility rules. Players may hold more than one non-FIFA nationality.

Coaching changes 
Note: Flags indicate national team as has been defined under FIFA eligibility rules. Players may hold more than one non-FIFA nationality.

Foreign players
Note: Flags indicate national team as has been defined under FIFA eligibility rules. Players may hold more than one non-FIFA nationality.

Players name in bold indicates the player is registered during the mid-season transfer window.
 Foreign players who left their clubs or were de-registered from playing squad due to medical issues or other matters.
 Johor Darul Ta'zim II swop the strikers with Johor Darul Ta'zim

Half-Malaysian players
Note: Flags indicate national team as has been defined under FIFA eligibility rules. Players may hold more than one non-FIFA nationality.

Results

League table

Result table

Positions by round

Statistics

Top scorers

Hat-tricks 

Notes:
4 Player scored 4 goals; 6 Player scored 6 goals; (H) – Home ; (A) – Away

Own goals

Clean sheets

Monthly awards

Attendances

Crowd attendance for all venues

By Team

See also 
 2017 Liga Super
 2017 Liga FAM
 2017 Piala FA
 2017 Piala Malaysia
 2017 Piala Presiden
 2017 Piala Belia
 List of Malaysian football transfers 2017

References

External links
 Football Association of Malaysia website
 Football Malaysia LLP website

Liga Premier
Malaysia Premier League seasons
1